Kalbajar District is one of the 66 districts of Azerbaijan. It is located in the west of the country and belongs to the East Zangezur Economic Region. The district borders the districts of Lachin, Khojaly, Agdam, Tartar, Goranboy, Goygol and Dashkasan districts of Azerbaijan, as well as the Gegharkunik and Vayots Dzor provinces of Armenia. Its capital and largest city is Kalbajar. As of 2020, the district had a nominal population of 94,100.

History 

In Turkic Kalbajar means "Castle on the mouth of the river". The city of Kalbajar was renamed to Karvachar after its occupation in the First Nagorno-Karabakh war, which corresponds to the ancient district of Vaykunik, one of 12 cantons of Artsakh. It was also known as Upper-Khachen or Tsar (after its chief town) and was ruled by one of the branches of the House of Khachen, who held it until the Russian conquest of the Karabakh region in the early 19th century. In 1992, Azerbaijan abolished the Mardakert District of the Nagorno-Karabakh Autonomous Oblast, and its western part was included in the Kalbajar district.

Armenian occupation 
As a result of the First Nagorno-Karabakh War, the area was occupied by Armenian forces on April 3, 1993. The district was declared a part of the self-proclaimed Republic of Artsakh, although it continued to be recognized by United Nations as a territory of the Republic of Azerbaijan. The Azerbaijani population of Kalbajar were displaced and lived as internally displaced persons in other regions of Azerbaijan. The district was made into the Shahumyan Province, one of the eight regions of NKR. The region remained the least populated of the NKR regions with a total population of 2,800. The town of Kalbajar was home to 500 Armenian residents.

Return to Azerbaijan 
Under the terms of the agreement that ended the 2020 Nagorno-Karabakh War, most of the district (i.e. Kelbajar district within its Soviet time borders) returned to Azerbaijani control. The eastern part of the district, which was part of Martakert Province, remained under the control of the Republic of Artsakh. Initially, the western part was to be returned to Azerbaijani control by 15 November 2020, but this deadline was subsequently extended to 25 November 2020. In the early hours of November 25, Azerbaijani forces entered the region; it was the second region to be returned to Azerbaijan per the ceasefire agreement.

Cultural monuments 
The district has close to 750 Armenian cultural monuments,  which include monasteries, churches, chapels, fortresses, khachkars and inscriptions. The most well-known is the monasteries of Dadivank and Gandzasar.

Economy

In 2022, the small 4.4 MW hydroelectric power plant Kelbajar-1 was taken into operation.

Demographics 
As of 1979 the region had a population of 40,516:
 Azerbaijanis 99.5% (40,329)
 Armenians 0.1% (49)
 Lezgins 0.1% (30)
 Russians  0.1% (46)

In 1980, the population excluding Nagorno Karabakh was 40,300, counting 124 settlements. 8 of these settlements were Kurdish.

The population grew to 43,713 by 1989.

As of 1999, the population in the Kalbajar District including part of the now-abolished Mardakert District was 66,211, however the census counts were not carried out in Armenian-occupied parts of Kalbajar:
 Azerbaijanis 83.2% (55,082)
 Armenians 14.8% (9,794)
 Lezgins 0,1% (9)
 Kurds 1.9% (1,248)
 Russians  0.1% (23)
 Other 0.1% (45)

During Armenian occupation 
Starting in the early 2000s, the district was slowly repopulated by Armenian settlers from eastern Shahumyan and Gulustan area.

According to 2005 census carried out by the self-proclaimed Republic of Artsakh, 2,560 Armenians were living in the western part of the Shahumyan Province, which roughly corresponded to the Soviet Kalbajar District. The number grew to 2,800 by 2006.

By 2015, the number of Armenians who had settled in the district had grown to 3,090 according to the statistics provided by Artsakh.

However, the international observers provided different figures. An OSCE Fact-Finding Mission visited the occupied territories of Azerbaijan in 2005 to inspect settlement activity in the area and report its findings to the Co-Chairs of the OSCE Minsk Group. According to FFM figures, at that time the number of Armenian settlers in Kalbajar District was approximately 1,500. The OSCE Minsk Group Co-Chairs, who conducted a Field Assessment Mission to the occupied territories of Azerbaijan in October 2010 reported that there was no significant growth in the population since 2005.

Villages 
 

Xanməmməd-Bünaən

See also 
 Armenian-occupied territories surrounding Nagorno-Karabakh
 Battle of Kalbajar
 List of power stations in Azerbaijan

References 

 
Districts of Azerbaijan